The San Gabriel Valley Transit Authority (SGVTA) was a small quasi-governmental, public interest corporation operating as a bus transit provider in Los Angeles County, California providing free transport services to seniors, poor and disabled members of the  cities of Monrovia and Sierra Madre. The SGVTA entered into a Memoranda of Understanding (MOU) with the two cities. Its equipment consisted primarily of five lift-equipped coaches and a 50 passenger bus.  Its paid staff included fewer than a dozen coach and bus drivers.

Two Swedish nationals, Carl Freer and Stefan Eriksson made donations to the SGVTA under its non-profit corporate status. Freer and Eriksson allegedly presented SGVTA business cards to identify themselves as civilian members of the SGVTA's police department following a well publicized car crash involving Eriksson.

Later developments
The SGVTA was notable for having had a transit police force consisting primarily of volunteer commissioners and auxiliaries. The SGVTA's "police agency" was not a participating agency in the California Commission on Peace Officer Standards & Training (POST) program. Eriksson was a businessman who was found with SGVTA business cards purportedly from its "police agency" after being involved in a high profile traffic accident.

Another Swedish national, Carl Freer was also arrested after he allegedly flashed a police commissioner's identification card from SGVTA in order to purchase a gun from a dealer without the required background checks. Los Angeles County sheriff's detectives said they found 12 rifles and four handguns during searches at the Swedish national's home in the Bel-Air community and on his 100-foot yacht docked at Marina del Rey. No charges were ever filed against Freer in connection with that arrest, and each of the rifles and handguns taken during the search of his home were returned.

The SGVTA founder and operator of an auto repair service in Monrovia was briefly detained while trying to recover two of the agency's vehicles which had been impounded as part of the investigation into the "SGVTA Police" by the Los Angeles County Sheriff's Department. Authorities claimed that he had committed perjury in official documents filed with the California Department of Motor Vehicles (DMV), by claiming that the SGVTA was a government entity.

SGVTA's services were discontinued as of July 18, 2006.

References

Public transportation in the San Gabriel Valley
Bus transportation in California
Public transportation in Los Angeles County, California
San Gabriel Valley
2006 disestablishments in California